The National Cadet Bisley Grand Champion Medal is a military medal which was instituted by the Republic of South Africa in 1987. Originally named the Cadet Corps Grand Champion Shot Medal, it was awarded  to the Grand Champion of the annual National Cadet Bisley of the School Cadet Corps.

The South African military
The Union Defence Forces (UDF) were established in 1912 and renamed the South African Defence Force (SADF) in 1958. On 27 April 1994, it was integrated with six other independent forces into the South African National Defence Force (SANDF).

Institution
The National Cadet Bisley Grand Champion Medal was instituted by the State President in 1987.

Award criteria
The medal could be awarded to the grand champion of the annual National Cadet Bisley of the School Cadet Corps.

Order of wear

The position of the National Cadet Bisley Grand Champion Medal in the official order of precedence was revised three times after 1975, to accommodate the inclusion or institution of new decorations and medals, first upon the integration into the South African National Defence Force on 27 April 1994, again in April 1996 when decorations and medals were belatedly instituted for the two former non-statutory forces, the Azanian People's Liberation Army and Umkhonto we Sizwe, and finally upon the institution of a new set of awards on 27 April 2003, but it remained unchanged on the latter two occasions.

South African Defence Force until 26 April 1994
  
Official SADF order of precedence:
 Preceded by the SADF Champion Shot Medal.
 Succeeded by the Dekoratie voor Trouwe Dienst.
Official national order of precedence:
 Preceded by the SADF Champion Shot Medal.
 Succeeded by the Dekoratie voor Trouwe Dienst.

South African National Defence Force from 27 April 1994
  
Official SANDF order of precedence:
 Preceded by the SADF Champion Shot Medal of the Republic of South Africa.
 Succeeded by the President's Medal for Shooting of the Republic of Ciskei.
Official national order of precedence:
 Preceded by the SADF Champion Shot Medal of the Republic of South Africa.
 Succeeded by the President's Medal for Shooting of the Republic of Ciskei.

Description
The National Cadet Bisley Grand Champion Medal is unusual in that the South African Coat of Arms does not appear anywhere on it.

Obverse
The medal is a round medallion struck in silver, 3 millimetres thick and 38 millimetres in diameter, depicting the prancing springbok emblem of the School Cadet Corps of the South African Defence Force, partly surrounded by a wreath of leaves.

Reverse
The reverse has the words "KADETKORPS" and "CADET CORPS" in the centre, surrounded by the words "GROOTKAMPIOENSKUT" above and "GRAND CHAMPION SHOT" below, with the medal number engraved underneath the centre inscription. The reverse of the specimen medal depicted is erroneously inscribed "SHOTS" instead of "SHOT" and has a plain undecorated suspender reverse side.

Ribbon
The ribbon is 32 millimetres wide and yellow, with 6 millimetres wide dark green edges. The green and yellow colours have their origin in the ribbon colours of the three awards which were belatedly instituted in 1920, as retrospective awards for Boer veteran officers and men of the Second Boer War of 1899–1902, the Dekoratie voor Trouwe Dienst, the Medalje voor de Anglo-Boere Oorlog and the Lint voor Verwonding. For these three awards, these two colours had been gazetted as green and orange, but the orange appeared as yellow on the actual ribbons. The School Cadet Corps was part of the Commando system and green and yellow were the dominant colours of the ribbons of most other South African decorations and medals which were instituted for award to Commando members.

Status
Originally shown in the official order of precedence list as named the "Cadet Corps Champion Shot Medal" in 1993, the name of the medal was shown as the "National Cadet Bisley Grand Champion Medal" in 2003. The medal did not appear under either name in the list of decorations and medals which were discontinued on 26 April 2003 and is therefore, technically speaking, still current.

References

Military decorations and medals of South Africa
1987 establishments in South Africa
Awards established in 1987